Christopher Bruce  (born 3 October 1945 in Leicester) is a British choreographer and performer. He was the Artistic Director of the Rambert Dance Company until 2002.

He has choreographed many pieces from Andrew Lloyd-Webber/Alan Ayckbourn musical Jeeves at Her Majesty's Theatre, London in 1975.
In addition to performing and choreographing, he has created many works for Rambert and for Nederlands Dans Theater, Houston Ballet and Cullberg Ballet and has had a long-term association with the English National Ballet and the Houston Ballet.

His works include Cruel Garden, Ghost Dances, Sergeant Early's Dream, Swansong, Moonshine, Stream, Shadows, Quicksilver, The World Again, Symphony in Three Movements, Land and Rooster.

Bruce was appointed a CBE for a lifetime's service to dance because he was one of Britain's leading choreographers. He is a visiting honorary professor at the University of Exeter since 2009.

He is also been given an Honorary Doctor of Art from De Montfort University, Honorary Doctor of Letters from University of Exeter in 2001 and an Honorary Life Membership of Amnesty International.

References

External links
 Christopher Bruce oral history interview at the Rambert Archive

Living people
1945 births
English choreographers
British male ballet dancers
Commanders of the Order of the British Empire
National Dance Award winners
20th-century British ballet dancers
People from Leicester